Dhakki is a town and union council of Charsadda District in Khyber Pakhtunkhwa province of Pakistan. It is located at 34°18'17N 71°46'24E and has an altitude of 359 metres (1181 feet).

The village has a higher secondary school for boys, a high school for girls and a basic health unit (BHU). It is about 50 kilometers from Peshawar.
The soil is very fertile, irrigated by Upper Swat Canal. The main crops are sugarcane, tobacco, wheat, maize and vegetables. Apricot, plum, peach and pear orchards are stretched all over the landscape.

References

Union councils of Charsadda District
Populated places in Charsadda District, Pakistan